Paul Dienstbach (born 10 October 1980 in Giessen) is a German rower. He has competed for Germany in the World Rowing Championships.

References 

1980 births
Living people
German male rowers
Sportspeople from Giessen
World Rowing Championships medalists for Germany